Dorcadion taborskyi is a species of beetle in the family Cerambycidae. It was described by Heyrovsky in 1941. It is known from Greece and Turkey.

References

taborskyi
Beetles described in 1941